"Candidatus Bartonella volans" is a candidatus bacteria from the genus of Bartonella which was isolated from flying squirrels (Glaucomys volans)
.

References

Bartonellaceae
Candidatus taxa